A Handful of Love is a 1974 Swedish period drama film directed by Vilgot Sjöman. It was entered into the 24th Berlin International Film Festival. At the 10th Guldbagge Awards the film won the awards for Best Film and Best Director.

Cast
 Anita Ekström as Hjördis
 Gösta Bredefeldt as Daniel Severin Larsson
 Ingrid Thulin as Inez Crona
 Ernst-Hugo Järegård as Claes Crona
 Sif Ruud as Thekla Renholm
 Per Myrberg as Sebastian Renholm
 Eva-Britt Strandberg as Therese
 Frej Lindqvist as Fritz Fredrik Crona
 Anders Oscarsson as Henning Christian Crona
 Gunnar Ossiander as Grandfather Crona
 Chris Wahlström as Magdalena
 Bibi Skoglund as Adele
 Claire Wikholm as Zaida
 Ernst Günther as Finland
 Harald Hamrell as Linus

References

External links
 
 

1974 films
1974 drama films
1970s Swedish-language films
Films set in the 1900s
Swedish historical drama films
1970s historical drama films
Films directed by Vilgot Sjöman
Best Film Guldbagge Award winners
Films whose director won the Best Director Guldbagge Award
1970s Swedish films